The 1927 French Championships (now known as the French Open) was a tennis tournament that took place on the outdoor clay courts at the Stade Francais in Saint-Cloud, France. The tournament ran from 27 May until 5 June. It was the 32nd staging of the French Championships and the second Grand Slam tournament of the year.

Kea Bouman and René Lacoste won the singles titles. Bouman became the first foreign woman to win the women's singles event and the first, and to date only, Dutch woman to win a Grand Slam singles title.

Finals

Men's singles

 René Lacoste (FRA) defeated  Bill Tilden (USA) 6–4, 4–6, 5–7, 6–3, 11–9

Women's singles

 Kea Bouman (NED) defeated  Irene Peacock (RSA) 6–2, 6–4

Men's doubles
 Henri Cochet (FRA) /  Jacques Brugnon (FRA) defeated  Jean Borotra (FRA) /  René Lacoste (FRA) 2–6, 6–2, 6–0, 1–6, 6–4

Women's doubles
 Irene Peacock (RSA) /  Bobbie Heine (AUS) defeated  Peggy Saunders Mitchell (GBR) /  Phoebe Holcroft Watson (GBR) 6–2, 6–1

Mixed doubles
 Marguerite Broquedis (FRA) /  Jean Borotra (FRA) defeated  Lilí de Álvarez (ESP) /  Bill Tilden (USA) 6–4, 2–6, 6–2

References

External links
 French Open Official website

French Championships
French Championships
French Championships (tennis) by year
May 1927 sports events
June 1927 sports events
1927 in Paris
French